The Last of the Jedi is a series of young adult science-fiction novels written by Jude Watson from 2005 to 2008. The series is set in the fictional Star Wars Legends  (formerly known as the Star Wars Expanded Universe and discarded from the canon in 2014), the series is set in the time period between the end of Star Wars: Episode III – Revenge of the Sith and a few years prior to Episode IV – A New Hope. This series follows the life of Obi-Wan Kenobi, following the events of Revenge of the Sith until he finds ex-Padawan Ferus Olin. The remainder of the series focuses on a small band of surviving Jedi.

References

External links
CargoBay Listing
CargoBay Listing
CargoBay Listing
Official CargoBay listing

2005 American novels
2006 American novels
2007 American novels
2008 American novels
Book series introduced in 2005
Star Wars: The Last of the Jedi
Star Wars Legends novels
Series of books
Interquel novels